Koh-Lanta: Le Feu Sacré is the twenty-fourth regular season of the French reality television series Koh-Lanta. This season consists of 20 contestants surviving in Caramoan in the Philippines where they'll survive for 40 days and each other to win the grand prize of €100,000. The season premiered on 21 February 2023 on TF1.

Contestants

Challenges

Voting History

Notes

References

External links

French reality television series
Koh-Lanta seasons
2023 French television seasons